Senator Crook may refer to:

Robert Crook (1929–2011), Mississippi State Senate
Thomas Crook (1798–1879), New York State Senate
Thurman C. Crook (1891–1981), Indiana State Senate